Aleksanteri is a masculine Finnish given name. Notable people with the name include:

Aleksanteri Aava (1883–1956), Finnish poet
Aleksanteri Ahola-Valo (1900–1997), Finnish artist and architect
Aleksanteri Saarvala (1913–1989), Finnish gymnast
Aleksanteri Toivola (1893–1987), Finnish sport wrestler
Veikko Aleksanteri Heiskanen (1895–1971), Finnish geodesist

See also
Aleksanteri Institute, an institute of the University of Helsinki

Finnish masculine given names